The VoCore is "a coin-sized Linux computer with wifi". It is a single-board computer developed in China.
It includes WiFi (2.4 GHz 802.11 b/g/n), Ethernet (10/100 Mb/s x2), USB 2.0 (up to 480M) and 28 GPIO (reused).

It is entirely open source. Both the hardware and the software are available on the VoCore website.

See also

References

External links
 
 Forum
 Indiegogo campaign
 VoCore manual

Educational hardware
Linux-based devices
Single-board computers
Products introduced in 2014